Khutbat-e-Madras is a collection on the life of the Islamic prophet Muhammad by Syed Suleiman Nadvi, first published in 1936. Nadvi prepared the material for a non-Arab, non-Muslim audience.

Development 
Nadvi sought the approval of contemporary scholar Abul Hasan Ali Hasani Nadwi for the translation. The two met while Nadwi was passing through Khobar on his way back from Mecca, and Nadvi showed him his translation. Nadwi later wrote Nadvi a letter from India with his appreciation and comments.

Reception 
Abul Hasan Ali Hasani Nadwi described the book as a miracle of scholarship.

Further reading 

Read list. Connecticut Council of Masajid.

References 

Islamic literature
Sunni literature
20th-century Indian books
Indian non-fiction books
Indian religious texts
Books about Islam
Madras Presidency
Books by Sulaiman Nadvi
Deobandi literature